Minchev or Mintschev (Bulgarian: Минчев) is a Bulgarian masculine surname, its feminine counterpart is Minchevaor Mintscheva. Notable people with this surname include:

 Bozhidar Minchev (born 1946), Bulgarian ice hockey player
Dobrinka Mincheva (born 1962), Bulgarian swimmer
Donka Mincheva (born 1973), Bulgarian weightlifter
 Georgi Minchev (disambiguation), multiple people
 Ivan Minchev (born 1991), Bulgarian footballer
Maria Mintscheva (born 1952), Bulgarian sprint canoer
Mariana Mincheva (born 1959), Bulgarian rower
 Sevdalin Minchev (born 1974), Bulgarian weightlifter
 Simeon Minchev (born 1982), Bulgarian footballer
 Tenyo Minchev (born 1954), Bulgarian footballer
Velitscha Mintscheva, Bulgarian sprint canoer

Bulgarian-language surnames